Sevda Erginci (born 3 October 1993 in Istanbul,Turkey) is a Turkish actress with Arabic roots, she have college degree in acting and degree from the Institute of Music.

Life and career
Sevda Erginci was born on 3 October 1993 in Istanbul, Turkey. Her father is from antique multicultural city Mardin, and her mother immigrated from Macedonia.

Erginci began acting at the age of 15, taking part in the play Paki ve Sevgi Çiçekleri for Semaver Company, and then took acting lessons at Kenter Theatre. In 2012, she was cast in Koyu Kırmızı alongside Özgü Namal and Ozan Güven, and in the same year appeared in the historical drama Veda. Between 2013–2014, she portrayed the character of Ayşe in Karagül. She made her cinematic debut in 2015 with a role in Uzaklarda Arama, written by Onur Ünlü. After playing main roles in youth series Hayat Bazen Tatlıdır and Ver Elini Aşk, she was cast in Yasak Elma, portraying the character of Zeynep Yilmaz. In 2019, she played the role of İpek Gencer in Sevgili Geçmiş. In 2020, she starred in the historical series Uyanış: Büyük Selçuklu and depicted the character of Turna Hatun.

Filmography

Awards 

 İKÜ Career Honorary Awards / Best New Actress of the Year
 Medipol İK Business Awards / Best Debut by an Actress

References

External links 
 
 

Living people
1993 births
Actresses from Istanbul
Turkish film actresses
Turkish television actresses
Turkish people of Macedonian descent